Kirby is an action-platform video game series developed by HAL Laboratory and published by Nintendo. The series centers around the adventures of a pink round hero named Kirby as he fights to protect and save his home on the distant Planet Popstar from a variety of threats. The majority of the games in the series are side-scrolling platformers with puzzle-solving and beat 'em up elements. Kirby has the ability to inhale enemies and objects into his mouth, spitting them out as a projectile or eating them. If he inhales certain enemies, he can gain the powers or properties of that enemy manifesting as a new weapon or power-up called a Copy Ability. The series is intended to be easy to pick up and play even for people unfamiliar with action games, while at the same time offering additional challenge and depth for more experienced players to come back to.

The Kirby series includes a total of over thirty games, and has sold over 40 million units worldwide, making it one of Nintendo’s best-selling franchises and putting it in the top 50 best-selling video game franchises of all time.

Gameplay 

The main Kirby games are side-scrolling action platforms. As Kirby, the spherical pink protagonist, the player must run, jump, and attack enemies while traversing a number of areas, solving puzzles, and battling bosses along the way. Kirby possesses the ability to inhale objects and enemies even larger than himself, which he can spit out as a projectile or swallow. Some enemies, when swallowed, will grant Kirby a Copy Ability, which allows him to take on a characteristic of that enemy and use it in combat. For example, upon swallowing an enemy that breathes fire, Kirby becomes able to breathe fire. Kirby can also take in air to inflate himself and fly. In most games, he can do this for as long as he wants, but his attack options become limited.

Kirby games often contain a number of hidden items that unlock more parts of the game or are simple incentives to collect, and are usually required to reach 100% in-game completion. These special items are usually related to the plot of the game, most often used to create a special weapon needed to defeat the final boss. In some games, the special weapon is optional and can be used regularly in the game after defeating the final boss with it. These elements have remained constant in most series, with each game having its own unique twist to affect gameplay.

Each game features uniquely-named areas such as flaming mountains, open grasslands, water-filled or submerged areas, frozen snowfields, and similar natural locations.

There are also several spin-off games in the series, which involve a variety of different video game genres such as pinball, puzzle, racing, and motion-sensor-technology-based games. A number of these spin-off titles take advantage of Kirby's ball-shaped figure.

Plot

Characters 

The series' main protagonist is Kirby, who resides in the kingdom of Dream Land on a five-point-star-shaped planet called Popstar. Much of Dream Land is peaceful, and its people lead laid-back, carefree lives. However, when the peace in Dream Land is shattered by threats both terrestrial and alien, it is up to Kirby to save his home and those who reside there.

Besides Kirby, many characters appear throughout the series as both allies and enemies, the most common being King Dedede, a gluttonous bird resembling a blue penguin and self-proclaimed ruler of Dream Land. King Dedede has appeared in all Kirby games except Kirby & the Amazing Mirror. King Dedede's selfish nature often leads him to clash with Kirby, but he sometimes teams up with Kirby when a greater threat emerges.

Another major character in the series is the enigmatic Meta Knight, a chivalrous masked creature similar in size and shape to Kirby who one day wishes to fight the strongest warrior in the galaxy and leads a group of like-minded warriors. Whenever he and Kirby fight, he will always offer Kirby a sword in advance so that the fight is fair. While his unmasked face resembles Kirby's, his exact relationship with Kirby remains a mystery.

Popstar is home to a number of common creatures, the most notable of which are called Waddle Dees. They appear in some capacity in every Kirby game and are usually passive or aggressive towards the player, with some exceptions, such as in Kirby and the Forgotten Land, where they are friendly and rely on the player to save them from cages, acting as the game's main collectible.

A certain Waddle Dee known as Bandana Waddle Dee, who wears a blue bandana and commonly wields a spear, occasionally assists Kirby and appears as a playable character in some games, such as in Kirby and the Forgotten Land and Kirby's Return to Dream Land.

Development

1992–1999: Conception and first games 

The first game in the Kirby series, Kirby's Dream Land for the original Game Boy, was released in Japan on April 27, 1992 and later in North America, Europe and Australasia in August that year. A simple game, consisting of five levels, it introduced Kirby's ability to inhale enemies and objects. The game contains an unlockable hard mode, known as the "Extra Game", which features stronger enemies and more difficult bosses. The North American box art showed a white Kirby, although the Japanese box art had the correct pink coloring.

The second game, Kirby's Adventure, was released in Japan on March 23, 1993, in North America on May 1, 1993, and Europe on September 12, 1993. Kirby's Adventure gave Kirby the ability to gain special powers when he ate certain enemies, called Copy Abilities; the game contained a total of 25 different ones to use. These powers replaced Kirby's inhale and could be used until Kirby sustained damage causing him to drop the ability, or the player voluntarily discarded it to obtain another one. As one of the last games created for the Nintendo Entertainment System, Kirby's Adventure featured advanced graphics and sound that pushed the hardware's capabilities to the limit, including pseudo 3D effects on some stages. It was remade in 2002 on the Game Boy Advance, retitled Kirby: Nightmare in Dream Land, featuring updated graphics and sound, multiplayer support, and the ability to play as Meta Knight.

After Kirby's Adventure, the Kirby series received a number of spin-off games. Kirby's Pinball Land, released in November 1993 for the Game Boy, is a pinball game featuring Kirby as the pinball. Kirby's Dream Course, released in Japan on September 21, 1994, North America on February 1, 1995, and Europe on August 24, 1995 for the Super Nintendo Entertainment System, is a golf-based game which features an isometric graphic design. Kirby's Avalanche, released in Europe on February 1, 1995 and in North America on April 25, 1995 also for the Super Nintendo Entertainment System, is a puzzle game, a westernized version of the Japanese game Puyo Puyo.

Kirby's Dream Land 2, released in Japan on March 21, 1995, in North America on May 1, 1995, in Europe on July 31, 1995 and Australasia on November 22, 1995 for the Game Boy, brought the Copy Abilities from Kirby's Adventure to a handheld system, but due to system limitations lowered the number of abilities to seven. The game introduced three rideable animal companions: Rick the hamster, Coo the owl, and Kine the ocean sunfish. Pairing up with any of these three alters how Kirby's abilities work.

Kirby's Block Ball, released for the Game Boy on December 14, 1995 in Japan, on March 13, 1996 in North America and on August 29, 1996 in Europe, is a variation of the game Breakout, featuring multiple levels, some of Kirby's Copy Abilities, and various enemies in unique boss battles. In 1996, a Kirby minigame series,  was released via the St.GIGA satellite broadcasting system for the Satellaview. These minigames were given a unique broadcast date. Minigames included Arrange Ball, Ball Rally, Baseball, Cannonball, Guru Guru Ball, Hoshi Kuzushi, Pachinko, and Pinball.

Kirby Super Star, known as Hoshi no Kirby Super Deluxe in Japan and Kirby's Fun Pak in Europe, was released for the Super Nintendo Entertainment System in Japan on March 21, 1996, in North America on September 20, 1996, and in Europe on January 23, 1997. Kirby Super Star is composed of eight separate games, and features several characters and abilities which have not appeared since in the series. The game features "Helpers", which can be created by sacrificing the ability in use, to help the player dispatch enemies.

Released for the Game Boy in 1997, Kirby's Star Stacker is a puzzle game which involves touching two or more similar blocks together that have Kirby's animal friends on them. The game received a sequel on the Super Nintendo Entertainment System in 1998 in Japan titled Kirby no Kirakira Kizzu (known in English as Kirby's Super Star Stacker).

Kirby's Dream Land 3, released for the Super Nintendo Entertainment System on November 27, 1997 in North America and on March 27, 1998 in Japan, is a direct sequel to Kirby's Dream Land 2, as it featured the return of Kirby's animal friends. Similar to Kirby's Dream Land 2, Kirby's Dream Land 3 features a few Copy Abilities which were modified when Kirby paired up with one of his six animal friends. The game had a multiplayer option with the second player controlling Gooey, a recurring character. The antagonist is Dark Matter, and if certain conditions are met, Zero was fought as the true final boss. The game had a unique pastel-drawing art style and used dithering to improve visual performance.

There was also a planned game called Kid Kirby that was to be released on the Super Nintendo Entertainment System. The game would have served as a prequel to the series and would have utilized the SNES Mouse. The game was developed by DMA Design and was scheduled for release in 1995, but was canceled due to the declining sales of the mouse; however, early screenshots of the canceled game have been posted online.

2000: Introduction of 3D graphics 

The first game to have 3D graphics in the Kirby series, Kirby 64: The Crystal Shards, was released on the Nintendo 64 in Japan on March 24, 2000, in North America on June 26, 2000 and in Europe on June 22, 2001. The game features a compound ability system that allows two of the seven abilities in the game to be merged, making a new compound ability. It also marked the first playable instance of King Dedede, where sections of some stages had Kirby riding piggyback while King Dedede attacked enemies and obstacles with his hammer. It is considered a direct follow-up to Kirby's Dream Land 3 due to the reemergence of Dark Matter and the final boss, albeit in a different form, called 02 (Zero Two). It also included three four-player minigames.

2000–2004: Further spin-off emphasis 

The next game in the Kirby series, Kirby Tilt 'n' Tumble became one of Nintendo's first motion-sensor-based games on August 23, 2000. Players are instructed to tilt the Game Boy Color to move Kirby on the screen. Quickly flicking the Game Boy Color upwards would make Kirby jump into the air. Tilt 'n' Tumble is the only Kirby game to have a special cartridge color (transparent pink) in North America. Kirby Tilt 'n' Tumble 2 on the GameCube, which was supposed to use a combination of motion-sensor technology and connectivity to the Game Boy Advance via the Nintendo GameCube Game Boy Advance Cable, was presented during Nintendo Space World 2001 and scheduled for a May 2002 release in Japan. The Kirby theme was eventually scrapped and Kirby was replaced with a generic marble, and the game was shown again at E3 2002 as Roll-O-Rama, but eventually canceled completely. Kirby Family was a Game Boy Color piece of software developed by Natsume that would connect to a compatible Jaguar JN-100 or JN-2000 sewing machine and embroider cloth with a Kirby pattern of choice. The game was also shown during Nintendo Space World 2001 and scheduled for release on September 10, 2001, but presumably canceled due to poor sales of Mario Family which released two weeks prior. The game was leaked on September 9, 2020, as part of the Game Boy Color lotcheck leak. In late 2002, Nintendo released Kirby: Nightmare in Dream Land, an enhanced remake of Kirby's Adventure for the Game Boy Advance (GBA). Kirby's Air Ride 64 (also known as Kirby Bowl 64 and Kirby Ball 64) on the Nintendo 64 was going to be a sequel to Kirby's Dream Course which featured an additional game mode where the player controlled Kirby on a snowboard. However, this was canceled for unknown reasons. Some of its concepts were later implemented into the only Kirby game for the GameCube, Kirby Air Ride, which was released in North America on October 13, 2003. Air Ride is a racing game which deviates greatly from other Kirby games, although still featuring series staples including enemies and Copy Abilities. After the release of Kirby Air Ride, the GameCube was going to have its own original Kirby game, simply titled Kirby for Nintendo GameCube at the time. It was nearly complete and featured at E3 2005, but was canceled due to troubles incorporating a unique multiplayer mechanic. At a later point, the game was concepted as a full 3D platformer visually similar to Kirby Air Ride, but also canceled because it did not achieve HAL Laboratory's quality standards. During the 2003 Holiday season, a Kirby e-Reader card for the Game Boy Advance was released. The card was released under two names, Kirby Slide and Kirby Puzzle. Swiping the card would allow for a sliding puzzle game starring Kirby to be played. Cards were given out at Toys "R" Us stores and in the 2003 December issues of Nintendo Power and Tips & Tricks. The game was released to advertise the English dub of Kirby: Right Back at Ya!

Kirby & the Amazing Mirror was released on October 18, 2004 on the Game Boy Advance. It is the second game released on that system, following Kirby: Nightmare in Dream Land. It features Kirby in a Metroidvania format, with all the levels being interconnected and able to be completed in any order. Also unique was the in-game phone, which can be used to summon up to three additional copies of Kirby to fight enemies and solve puzzles.

2005–2011: Touch-based gameplay 

The next game in the series is Kirby: Canvas Curse, released on the Nintendo DS in Japan on March 24, 2005, North America on June 13, 2005, Europe on November 25, 2005 and Australia on April 6, 2006 under the name Kirby Power Paintbrush. Unlike most previous Kirby games, the player does not directly control Kirby with a directional pad, analog stick, face buttons, or shoulder buttons. Instead, Kirby is a helpless ball, and can only move when he gains momentum, the player painting paths with the stylus to direct his movement.

This was followed by Kirby: Squeak Squad (titled Kirby: Mouse Attack in Europe) in late 2006, also on the Nintendo DS, which revived traditional Kirby gameplay and dabbled in the use of the touch screen to store several items and Copy Abilities in Kirby's stomach. Ability scrolls could be found that served as upgrades for each ability, giving them additional moves and/or enhanced functionality. An unlockable Copy Ability was also introduced.

Kirby Super Star Ultra, announced for the Nintendo DS in early fall 2007 and released on September 22, 2008 in North America, is a remake of Kirby Super Star. In addition to the nine games from Kirby Super Star, seven new games have been added. It features updated graphics, pre-rendered cutscenes, and a map on the touch screen. Kirby's Epic Yarn was announced for the Wii at E3 2010 and released in North America on October 17, 2010. Epic Yarn began development as an original game by Good-Feel called Fluff of Yarn, but was given the Kirby license at Nintendo's proposal. A fourth game for the Nintendo DS was released in North America on September 19, 2011, Kirby Mass Attack. The game features multiple copies of Kirby in touch screen-based gameplay reminiscent of games such as Lemmings.

2011–2021: Evolution of 2.5D platforming 

Kirby's Return to Dream Land (titled Kirby's Adventure Wii in PAL regions) was released on the Wii in North America on October 24, 2011, returning to the traditional Kirby gameplay and allowing up to four players to play simultaneously. Players 2–4 could choose to play as Meta Knight, King Dedede and/or Bandana Waddle Dee, each with dedicated abilities; they could also play as different-colored Kirbys which offered power copying abilities, or as a mixture of the options. The unique multiplayer mechanic originally to be incorporated in the GameCube build became the special attack in Return to Dream Land (where all players stack on each other, hold  and release at the same time).

An anthology disc for the Wii called Kirby's Dream Collection was released on July 19, 2012, in Japan and on September 16, 2012, in North America to celebrate Kirby's 20th Anniversary. It includes six games from the early history of the series, which are Kirby's Dream Land, Kirby's Adventure, Kirby's Dream Land 2, Kirby Super Star, Kirby's Dream Land 3, and Kirby 64: The Crystal Shards. It also has new Challenge Stages that run on the engine of Kirby's Return to Dream Land (titled Kirby's Adventure Wii in PAL regions), and a Kirby history section, which includes three episodes from Hoshi no Kirby (Kirby: Right Back at Ya! in North America). Similar to the Super Mario 25th Anniversary packaging in 2010, a booklet and a soundtrack containing music from the various games in the series are released alongside the disc.

On October 1, 2013, during a Nintendo Direct presentation, a new untitled original Kirby game for the Nintendo 3DS was announced, later named Kirby: Triple Deluxe. The game was released in Japan on January 11, 2014, in North America on May 2, 2014, in Europe on May 16, 2014, and in Australasia on May 17, 2014. It incorporated action spanning varied depths, where Kirby could swap between the foreground and background areas. It included a multiplayer fighting minigame called Kirby Fighters, where players could choose one of ten available abilities and fight on themed stages, with the winner being the last Kirby standing. It also included a rhythm-based action minigame starring King Dedede titled Dedede's Drum Dash. There were also over 250 in-game "keychains" to collect that featured sprites from previous Kirby games as well some original sprites based on characters from Triple Deluxe. 

In August 2014, Kirby Fighters Deluxe and Dedede's Drum Dash Deluxe (enhanced versions of the minigames in Kirby: Triple Deluxe) were released. At E3 2014, a new game for the Wii U was announced. Titled Kirby and the Rainbow Curse in North America and Kirby and the Rainbow Paintbrush in PAL regions, the game is a direct sequel to Kirby: Canvas Curse and features a similar gameplay style. It was released by Nintendo on January 22, 2015, in Japan, February 20, 2015, in North America, May 8, 2015, in Europe and May 9, 2015, in Australasia.

On March 3, 2016, during a Nintendo Direct presentation, Nintendo unveiled a new game based on the context of Kirby: Triple Deluxe called Kirby: Planet Robobot, the second Kirby game released on the Nintendo 3DS. It was released alongside a set of Amiibo figures made for the Kirby franchise, including a newly announced Amiibo, Waddle Dee, on April 28, 2016, in Japan, June 10, 2016, in North America and Europe, and June 11, 2016, in Australasia. The game is compatible with other Amiibo. It also includes 2 new minigames, called Kirby 3D Rumble and Team Kirby Clash, the former being an arena based, 3D action game where Kirby uses his inhale to defeat large groups of baddies to rack up points and achieve a high score, and the latter being a mix of fighting, platform, and role-playing. Players can level up to level 10, and can play with AI or other friends.

In a Nintendo Direct presentation on April 12, 2017, three new Kirby games were announced for Kirby's 25th Anniversary. The first game was Team Kirby Clash Deluxe, an enhanced version of the Kirby: Planet Robobot minigame Team Kirby Clash which was released the same day it was announced. The second game was Kirby's Blowout Blast, an enhanced version of the Kirby: Planet Robobot minigame Kirby 3D Rumble which was released on July 4, 2017, in Japan, and on July 6, 2017, in North America, Europe and Australasia. The third game was Kirby Battle Royale, an action-multiplayer fighting game which was released on November 3, 2017, in Europe and Australasia, November 30, 2017, in Japan, and January 19, 2018, in North America.

At E3 2017, Nintendo unveiled a new untitled original installment for the Nintendo Switch, later named Kirby Star Allies. The game was released on March 16, 2018. Kirby can throw Friend Hearts to turn enemies into computer- or player-controlled allies, a variation of the "Helper System" from Kirby Super Star. "Power Combinations" return from Kirby 64: The Crystal Shards and Kirby: Squeak Squad. Kirby can also summon "Dream Friends", consisting of major Kirby characters acting as Helpers, which includes King Dedede, Meta Knight, and Bandana Waddle Dee.

On March 8, 2019, Epic Yarn got a remake/port on the Nintendo 3DS entitled Kirby's Extra Epic Yarn. On September 4, 2019, Nintendo released a new Nintendo Switch game, Super Kirby Clash, on the Nintendo eShop, as the successor to Team Kirby Clash Deluxe. The game expands on the previous installment with new quests. On September 23, 2020, Nintendo released a new Nintendo Switch game, Kirby Fighters 2, on the Nintendo eShop, as the successor to Kirby Fighters Deluxe. Before its official reveal, the game was leaked on the Play Nintendo website, but was later taken down. The game expands on the previous installment with new game modes and an exclusive ability, Wrestler.

2022–present: Introduction of 3D gameplay 

During the Nintendo Direct event held on September 23, 2021, a new Nintendo Switch title in the Kirby series was revealed, titled Kirby and the Forgotten Land. It is the first true 3D entry in the mainline series (fourth overall since the spin-offs Kirby Air Ride, Kirby's Blowout Blast, and Kirby Battle Royale) and was released on March 25, 2022.

On July 12, 2022, a new Nintendo Switch title in the Kirby series was announced, titled Kirby's Dream Buffet. It is a multiplayer party game, and was released on the Nintendo eShop on August 17, 2022. A remake of Kirby's Return to Dream Land for the Nintendo Switch, titled Kirby's Return to Dream Land Deluxe was revealed during the Nintendo Direct event held on September 13, 2022 and was released on February 24, 2023. It features new Mecha and Sand Abilities and the graphical style of a comic book.

Reception 

The Kirby games have received reception that ranges from mixed to very favourable reviews by players and critics. Kirby: Canvas Curse and Kirby's Epic Yarn are the most acclaimed games in the series, while Kirby Battle Royale and Team Kirby Clash Deluxe are the lowest-rated.

Sales 
Many Kirby games have performed commercially well, selling at least one million or more copies worldwide. Kirby's Dream Land, the first title in the series, had been its best-selling game until it was overtaken by Kirby and the Forgotten Land thirty years into the series. The worst-selling game in the millions is Kirby Mass Attack. Sales information for games that have sold less than one million copies is unavailable.

The Kirby manga has over 10 million copies in print.

As a brand, the series sold $150 million to $200 million worth of merchandise in 2002.

Legacy

Crossovers 

Kirby appears as a character in Nintendo's crossover fighting game series Super Smash Bros. (also developed by series creator Masahiro Sakurai), appearing in all installments of the franchise. Starting with Super Smash Bros. Brawl onwards, he's joined by Meta Knight and King Dedede. Many items from the Kirby series also appear in Super Smash Bros. such as the Maxim Tomato (all games), Warp Star (since Melee), Dragoon (since Brawl) and Star Rod (all games) as items, and Knuckle Joe (since Brawl), Nightmare (since 3DS/Wii U) and Chef Kawasaki (Ultimate) appear as characters summoned by the Assist Trophy. All playable Kirby characters in Smash Bros. have the ability to jump more than twice. Kirby has also made cameo appearances in other games as well, such as The Legend of Zelda: Link's Awakening, EarthBound, Mario & Luigi: Superstar Saga and Stunt Race FX. The two Kirby Amiibo figures, one based on the Super Smash Bros. series and the other made for the Kirby franchise are compatible with Mario Kart 8 where they can be scanned to unlock a costume for the player's Mii based on his appearance, and Super Mario Maker where they can be scanned to unlock a Kirby costume.

Other media

Anime 

The Kirby series was made into an anime on October 6, 2001, Hoshi no Kaabii. It was produced by Warpstar Inc., a company formed between a joint investment between Nintendo and HAL Laboratory, Inc. It was licensed in North America by 4Kids Entertainment, under the title Kirby: Right Back at Ya!, on 4Kids TV, and was distributed by 4Kids Entertainment in North America and Nelvana Limited in Canada, with VHS and DVD distributions in North America by FUNimation Entertainment and DVD distributions in Australia by Magna Pacific. It ended in Japan in 2003 with 100 episodes.

The show is about the adventures Kirby has with his friends Tiff and Tuff after he crash lands in Dream Land (this is known as "Pupu Village" in the Japanese version and "Cappy Town" in the English dub), on Popstar. Here, he is a legendary Star Warrior destined to save the universe from the intergalactic conqueror known as Nightmare. However, because he was awakened 200 years too early he arrived in a childlike state and his powers haven't fully developed. The ruler of Dream Land, King Dedede, is jealous of the attention Kirby receives from its inhabitants and frequently orders monsters from Nightmare's company, Nightmare Enterprises, in an attempt to do away with Kirby. Nightmare Enterprises at first appears to be an intergalactic delivery company, but is really a front for Nightmare's intergalactic conquest that dupes unsuspecting customers into funding Nightmare's armies. Not yet ready to achieve his destiny, Kirby must learn how to use his incredible abilities with the help of his friends, and sometimes with the help of the enigmatic Meta Knight, who while he claims to be loyal to King Dedede, will often work behind the scenes in order to aid Kirby or train him in the use of his abilities.

The show is based on the game series, but rather than being a direct adaptation of any of the games it uses characters and concepts from the games (especially Kirby's Dream Land, Kirby's Adventure, and Kirby Super Star) to tell its own story.

Comics and manga 
Kirby stars in several manga series that have been drawn by over 20 manga artists.

The longest running Kirby manga, Kirby of the Stars: The Story of Dedede Who Lives in Pupupu, was serialized in CoroCoro Comic from 1994 to 2006, and released 25 tankōbon volumes with over 10 million copies being printed. The series was written and illustrated by Hirokazu Hikawa. The series was later published as a "best-of" collection, which featured the series' first new chapter in 11 years, as well as bonus comics. It was published in English as Kirby Manga Mania by Viz Media.

Notes

References

External links 

Official website
Official website 

 
HAL Laboratory games
Nintendo franchises
Video game franchises
Fantasy video games
Platform games
Action-adventure games
Superhero video games
Video games about children
Video games about shapeshifting
Video games about magic
Video games adapted into comics
Video games adapted into television shows
Video game franchises introduced in 1992